Teokotai James "Tango" Herman is a Cook Islands politician and member of the Cook Islands Parliament.  He is a member of the Cook Islands Party.

Herman is a boatbuilder who has served five terms as mayor of Aitutaki. He stood unsuccessfully for the electorate of Amuri–Ureia at the 2004 Cook Islands general election. He was first elected to parliament in the 2022 Cook Islands general election.

References

Living people
Members of the Parliament of the Cook Islands
Cook Islands Party politicians
Year of birth missing (living people)